Manduca huascara is a moth of the  family Sphingidae. It is known from Colombia.

References

Manduca
Moths described in 1941